Derrick Abu (born 18 December 2003) is a professional footballer currently playing as a right-back for Chelsea. Born in Germany, he is a youth international for England.

Club career
Born in Regensburg, Germany, to Nigerian parents, Abu's family moved to England in 2006, when he was two years old. After representing grassroots side Coezer FC at a tournament in Spain, he was scouted and signed by Premier League side Chelsea at under-11 level.

He signed a scholarship contract with The Blues in July 2020, before signing on professional terms in February 2021.

International career
Abu is eligible to represent England, Germany and Nigeria at international level. In 2019, he reportedly made himself available to represent Nigeria at youth international level. He has since stated his desire to represent all three countries before making a final decision on who to represent.

He has represented England at under-17 level.

Music career
Describing himself as having a "huge passion for music", Abu was involved with his church's choir from a young age, and wrote his first song at the age of eleven. He released a rap single in early 2022, and followed this up with an EP later the same year, under the name Cho$en.

Career statistics

Club

Discography

Singles
 Life's Changing (2022)
 Real Love (2022)
 Gucci (2022)
 little do you know (2022)
 Waste my time (2022)

EPs
 Page 1 (2022)

References

2003 births
Living people
Sportspeople from Regensburg
Footballers from Bavaria
English people of Nigerian descent
German people of Nigerian descent
English footballers
German footballers
England youth international footballers
Association football defenders
Chelsea F.C. players